Walter Galler (17 June 1899 – 10 October 1952) was a Swiss footballer who played for FC Basel. 

Galler joined Basel in 1920. He played as a forward. In the club's 1920/21 season Galler played two games for the team, both in the Swiss Serie A, without scoring. He played his debut on 10 October 1920 in the home game at the Landhof against Aarau and the game was drawn 2–2.

References

Sources
 Rotblau: Jahrbuch Saison 2017/2018. Publisher: FC Basel Marketing AG. 
 Die ersten 125 Jahre. Publisher: Josef Zindel im Friedrich Reinhardt Verlag, Basel. 
 Verein "Basler Fussballarchiv" Homepage

FC Basel players
Swiss men's footballers
Association football forwards
1899 births
1952 deaths